Artemisia norvegica is a species of flowering plant in the aster family known by the common names alpine sagewort, boreal sagewort, mountain sagewort, Norwegian mugwort, arctic wormwood, and spruce wormwood. It is found in cold locations in Eurasia (Scotland, Scandinavia, Ural Mountains of Russia) and high altitudes and high latitudes in North America (Nunavut, Yukon, Alaska, British Columbia, Alberta, Washington, Montana, Idaho, Wyoming, California).

Description
The nodding inflorescence bears flower heads containing ray and disc florets. The ray florets are female with no functioning male parts and the disc florets at the center are bisexual. The plant reproduces by seed and may spread vegetatively by sending out stolons. The seeds are dispersed on the wind.

Distribution and habitat
Artemisia norvegica grows in subalpine and alpine climates and in Arctic habitat such as tundra. It can be found in moraines, fell field habitat, alpine meadows, and areas dominated by grasses and sedges. In Alaska it occurs on the fjords of Prince William Sound alongside larkspur monkshood (Aconitum delphiniifolium), Eschscholtz's buttercup (Ranunculus eschscholtzii), and Canadian burnet (Sanguisorba canadensis). It grows on Alaskan mountains such as the Kenai Mountains with grasses, sedges, and willows. In the alpine tundra of the Rocky Mountains it grows in snowbeds and on turf made up of blackroot sedge (Carex elynoides) and alpine clover (Trifolium dasyphyllum). It occurs in the mountains of the Northwest Territories among lichens and grasses such as arctic bluegrass (Poa arctica).

Artemisia norvegica is food for a number of animals, such as mountain goats, which eat it during the summer in Alaska, as well as Sitka black-tailed deer and hoary marmots.

Artemisia norvegica is a pioneer species in the primary phase of ecological succession in disturbed areas, such as plains scoured by flooding. It has been known to colonize denuded soil in vehicle tracks. It was used to revegetate habitat disturbed during the construction of the Trail Ridge Road in Colorado.

Subspecies
 Artemisia norvegica subsp. norvegica  
 Artemisia norvegica subsp. saxatilis (Besser) H.M.Hall & Clem.

References

External links
Alaska Wildflowers, Artemisia norvegica ssp. saxatilis (Besser) H.M. Hall & Clem. with 11 photos
Oneline Atlas of the British & Irish Flora: Artemisia norvegica (Norwegian Mugwort)
British Wildflowers: Artemisia norvegica (Norwegian Mugwort)

norvegica
Flora of Norway
Flora of the Northwestern United States
Flora of the Russian Far East
Flora of Scotland
Flora of Siberia
Flora of Subarctic America
Flora of Western Canada
Flora of California
Flora of the Rocky Mountains
Flora of the Sierra Nevada (United States)
Plants described in 1817
Flora without expected TNC conservation status